, sometimes romanized and pronounced , are dried shavings of Lagenaria siceraria var. hispida, a variety of calabash gourd. Kanpyō is an ingredient in traditional Edo style Japanese cuisine. Cooked and flavored kanpyō is commonly used in futomaki sushi roll.

Kanpyō was originally grown in the Osaka region. Now it is a specialty product of Tochigi Prefecture, where it is a cottage industry. The region is so tied to the food product that it hosts the "Kanpyō Highway with History and Romance".

The gourd is harvested between late July and September. The white flesh of the gourd is cut into strips 3 cm wide and 3 mm thick, then either dried in the sun or dehydrated.  Over 200 tons a year of dried kanpyō are produced per year.  Kanpyō available in the United States is sometimes chemically bleach-dried to a very white color, as opposed to the creamy color of the naturally-dried kind.  Sulfur dioxide is sometimes used as a fumigant but must not be used in concentrations exceeding 5.0 g per 1 kg of dry matter.

Dishes featuring kanpyō

In addition to being the focus of many dishes, kanpyō strips are frequently used as an edible twist tie in dishes such as fukusa-zushi and chakin-zushi.  Typically the dried strips are boiled to soften, and then boiled a second time with soy sauce, sugar, and other ingredients added for flavor.

Futomaki
Kanpyō-maki, also called teppo maki ("gun barrel maki") as it looks like the end of a rifle
Matsukasa sushi ("pinecone sushi"), a roll using squid filet (instead of nori) wrapped around sushi rice, kanpyō, shiitake, snow peas, and whitefish
Shojin dashijiru, a vegan soup stock

See also
 Oden

References

Japanese cuisine
Dried foods
Cucurbitoideae